PlayCanvas is an open-source 3D game engine/interactive 3D application engine alongside a proprietary cloud-hosted creation platform that allows for simultaneous editing from multiple computers via a browser-based interface. It runs in modern browsers that support WebGL, including Mozilla Firefox and Google Chrome. The engine is capable of rigid-body physics simulation, handling three-dimensional audio and 3D animations.

PlayCanvas has gained the support of ARM, Activision and Mozilla.

The PlayCanvas engine was open-sourced on June 4, 2014.

In April 2019, BusinessInsider.com reported that the company was acquired by Snap Inc. in 2017.

Features 

The PlayCanvas platform has collaborative real-time Editor that allows editing project by multiple developers simultaneously. The engine supports the WebGL 1.0 and 2.0 standard to produce GPU accelerated 3D graphics and allows for scripting via the JavaScript programming language.
Projects can be distributed via a URL web link or packaged in native wrappers, p.g. for Android, using CocoonJS or for Steam using Electron, and many other options and platforms.

Notable PlayCanvas applications 

Various companies use PlayCanvas in projects of different disciplines of interactive 3D content in the web.

Disney created an educational game for Hour of Code based on its Moana film.

King published Shuffle Cats Mini as a launch title for Facebook Instant Games.

TANX – massively multiplayer online game of cartoon styled tanks.

Miniclip published number of games on their platform with increase of HTML5 games popularity on the web.

Mozilla collaborated with PlayCanvas team creating After the Flood demo for presenting cutting-edge features of WebGL 2.0.

See also 
 List of WebGL frameworks
 List of game engines
 JavaScript
 HTML5
 WebGL

References

External links 
PlayCanvas Official Website
PlayCanvas Engine (Open Source)
PlayCanvas API Reference
PlayCanvas Tutorials
Various free-to-play games built with PlayCanvas

Cloud applications
Collaborative real-time editors
Cross-platform free software
Free 3D graphics software
Free game engines
Free software programmed in JavaScript
Graphics libraries
IPhone video game engines
Software using the MIT license
Video game development software
Video game engines
Web applications
Web development
Web development software
Web software
WebGL